Cassinia theresae is a species of flowering plant in the family Asteraceae and is endemic to central New South Wales. It is an erect shrub with hairy young stems, needle-shaped leaves with flared bases, and corymbs of up to fifty flower heads.

Description
The upper surface of the leaves is densely scaly, the edges are rolled under and the lower surface is densely covered with white hairs. Between ten and fifty heads are arranged in corymbs  in diameter.

Taxonomy and naming
Cassinia theresae was first formally described in 2004 by Anthony Edward Orchard in Australian Systematic Botany from specimens collected between Tottenham and Tullamore in 2004.

Distribution
Cassinia theresae grows in woodland on plains in south-central New South Wales.

References

theresae
Asterales of Australia
Flora of New South Wales
Plants described in 2004